Totak is a lake in Vinje Municipality in Vestfold og Telemark county, Norway. The lake is part of the Skien river watershed (Skiensvassdraget), discharging via the river Tokke which flows into the lake Bandak to the south. This tremendous overdeepening marks it as a glacially formed lake with characteristics similar to a fjord. Its volume of  makes it the 20th largest by volume as well. The lake is a reservoir that holds water for the Tokke Hydroelectric Power Station.

Media gallery

See also
List of lakes in Norway

References

Vinje
Lakes of Vestfold og Telemark